Ferrissia neozelanica, also known as Gundlachia neozelanica, is a species of minute freshwater limpet, an aquatic pulmonate gastropod mollusk, or micromollusk, in the family Planorbidae.

As of 2014, this species was listed in the IUCN Red list twice: as Gundlachia neozelanica - data deficient and as Ferrissia neozelanicus - least concern.

Shell description
Shell depressed conoidal, oval-oblong, the sides straightened, subparallel, thin, semitransparent, horn-colour, with a blackish-green coating. Apex a little inclined to the right, situated at the posterior sixth of the length, flatly convex anteriorly; concentric lines of growth at regular intervals. Interior light brown, shining. Aperture is elongated oval, slightly broadened anteriorly. Specimens have been found with the septum partly formed, but not adult.

The shell length is up to 3 mm, the width up to 2 mm, and height up to 0.75 mm.

Anatomy 
These animals have a pallial lung, as do all pulmonate snails, but they also have a false gill or "pseudobranch". This serves as a gill as these limpets may sometimes not be able to reach the surface for air.

Distribution
This freshwater limpet is endemic to the South Island of New Zealand.

Habitat
These tiny limpets are found attached to stems and undersides of leaves of aquatic plants in quiet waters.

References
This article incorporates public domain text from the reference

External links
 Spencer H.G., Willan R.C., Marshall B.A. & Murray T.J. (2011). Checklist of the Recent Mollusca Recorded from the New Zealand Exclusive Economic Zone

Planorbidae
Gastropods of New Zealand
Gastropods described in 1905